Chalbi (also Romanized as Chalbī and Chalabī; also known as Kalābi) is a village in Esfandan Rural District, in the Central District of Komijan County, Markazi Province, Iran. At the 2006 census, its population was 1,082, in 265 families.

References 

Populated places in Komijan County